Elections were held in the organized municipalities in the Sudbury District of Ontario on October 25, 2010 in conjunction with municipal elections across the province.

Baldwin
Archie Boivin was elected as the reeve of Baldwin. Incumbent reeve Dennis Golden ran for re-election as a council candidate rather than as reeve.

Chapleau
Earle Freeborn, the incumbent mayor of Chapleau, did not stand for re-election. The election was won by councillor Andre Byham.

Espanola
Councillor Mike Lehoux defeated incumbent mayor Bernie Gagnon in Espanola, in a race which hinged largely on questions regarding the town's contract with Kilganan Group, a real estate developer whose plan for a new factory and residential development in the town has faced delays in 2010.

The election also attracted a bit of humorous media attention to the council candidacy of Jill Beer. Because her surname resulted in her election signs bearing the slogan "Beer for Council", several were seen on lawns in Sudbury as well as in Espanola. Beer won her seat.

French River
Former mayor Claude Bouffard was re-elected in French River over incumbent Collin Bourgeois, who had defeated Bouffard in the 2006 election.

Killarney
Incumbent mayor Morgan Pitfield won another term by acclamation in Killarney.

Markstay-Warren
Incumbent mayor Jean-Marc Chayer was defeated in Markstay-Warren, with challenger Sonja Flynn elected.

Nairn and Hyman
The election campaign in Nairn and Hyman was marked by two anonymous flyers circulated under the name "Concerned Citizens of Nairn and Hyman". The first attacked mayoral candidate Laurier Falldien and council candidates Wayne Austin, Bonnie Vataja, Shelly Lowery and Rod MacDonald, calling them the "Scream Team", while the other endorsed incumbent mayor Brian Channon and incumbent councillors Brigita Gingras, Charlene Martel and Ed Mazey, calling them the "Dream Team". In the final results, the "endorsed" candidates Gingras, Martel and Mazey were all re-elected to council, along with the "unendorsed" candidate Rod MacDonald, but Falldien defeated Channon in an overwhelming landslide for the mayoralty.

Sables-Spanish Rivers
Incumbent mayor Leslie Gamble was re-elected in Sables-Spanish Rivers, while Patricia Hnatiuk will serve as deputy mayor.

St. Charles
Incumbent mayor Claude Lemieux did not stand for re-election in St. Charles. The election was won by Paul Schoppmann.

References

2010 Ontario municipal elections
Sudbury District